Ideal World is a British TV shopping channel, broadcasting on Freeview, Satellite, Cable and online, with transactional websites, broadcast from studios in Peterborough.

History
Ideal World has its origins in the 1980s as a mail order company selling products via national press adverts and consumer exhibitions. The company was then called Wrightway Marketing and was run by Paul Wright and his business partner Val Kaye.

Ideal World launched on 17 April 2000 on digital satellite from studios in Peterborough.

Ideal World originally had Steve Whatley, Paul Lavers and Debbie Flint as the three main faces of the channel. It also helped to launch the careers of notable TV directors such as Brendan Sheppard arguably one of the most successful whose career would go on to include shows like CiTV, CBBC and Doctor Who. Mark Thatcher was installed as Head of Production, leading producers such as Lizz Brain, Linda Cooper and Lesley Hawksley.

On 6 March 2001, the facility at Peterborough was completely destroyed by fire.  The channel was back broadcasting within weeks from various temporary facilities whilst the main building was rebuilt, it was not fully operational again until September 2002.

On 18 April 2003, Ideal World's first sister channel Create and Craft was launched and on 1 January 2004 Ideal Vitality started broadcasting. This was originally a channel from Goldshield, "Goldshield Vitality", for which Ideal Shopping Direct provided the studio recording and broadcast facilities. However, by the end of 2005 Goldshield pulled out of the venture. Ideal Shopping then broadcast a similar channel focusing on health and beauty products from Ideal's range, under the 'Vitality' name. Ideal Vitality was then wound down and replaced with highlights from past Ideal World shows, the channel being renamed on the Sky EPG as Ideal World 2.  Ideal World 3, then followed, repeating Ideal World 2 shows.

On 23 April 2004, Ideal World began broadcasting on Freeview on Channel 22, a position it retained until 19 January 2022 when the channel traded places with another shopping TV channel, 'TJC', moving in the process to Channel 50. A week later, a Freeview re-shuffle moved the channel to number 51 on the EPG.

Jewellery Vault, a falling-auction style jewellery channel was launched on 1 July 2005 broadcasting live 5pm-1am and subsequently closed in July 2006 due to it not covering its operating costs.

On 3 March 2010, Ideal World 2 was renamed Ideal Extra and Ideal World 3 was renamed Ideal & More. On the same day, Ideal Extra launched on Freeview.

In 2011, the company was delisted from the AIM stock market, after acquisition by Village Ventures' investment fund, Inflexion Private Equity. The company was subsequently sold to The Blackstone Group, in 2015.

In May 2013, Ideal World became the subject of a BBC Watchdog investigation after viewer complaints about non-delivery of goods and allegedly poor quality of some products. Customers also alleged that complaints to Ideal World customer services either went unanswered or were not satisfactory. The Watchdog investigation followed claims by the Daily Mirror online that complaints about Ideal World submitted to its blog had "passed the 100 mark".
Ideal World was acquired by Aurelius Group, in July 2018, Aurelius originally owned Bid shopping and its subsidiary, Bid tv, between 2009 and 2013.

Ideal World on ITV and STV
On 1 August 2019, Ideal World and Create and Craft started to simulcast live broadcasts on ITV (and UTV) between midnight or thereafter until 3am, replacing Jackpot247. In September 2021, Ideal World started simulcasting on STV at the same time as ITV, meaning Ideal World is now broadcast nightly across the whole ITV network for the first time.

CCXTV 
CCXTV was launched by Ideal Shopping Direct Ltd on 15 April 2020 as an entertainment channel and took over Create and Craft's Freeview LCN 23, broadcasting from 0700h until 2200h, with a schedule of imports and re-runs of shows like The Bold and The Beautiful, Never the Twain and Hot in Cleveland. The channel was sold to UKTV in October 2020.  On 7 December 2020, CCXTV was moved to Freeview LCN 73  and UKTV's Dave Ja Vu was moved from Freeview LCN 79 to the vacated LCN 23.

CCXTV was discontinued on Freeview on 30 January 2021.

Sale of Create and Craft 
In January 2022 it was announced that the Create and Craft arm of the business would be sold to Hochanda Global Limited, owners of The Craft Store TV channel (formerly known as HOCHANDA).  Between then and 24 February 2022, Create and Craft was absorbed into The Craft Store's business with both channels running concurrently under the same ownership. On 25 February, Create & Craft's merge was complete by moving the channel into The Craft Store's slot on Freeview (channel 85), channel 95 however remains under ownership of Ideal World Ltd and is expected to close permanently soon. HOCHANDA Global Limited  announced intentions to use The Craft Store's name only for parts of their online business.

In February 2022, Ideal World was sold by asset management firm Aurelius Equity Opportunities to entrepreneur Hamish Morjaria.  To facilitate the full closure of the company, the Deramores knitting arm sold its stock to LoveCrafts  and subsequently closed down; iKan Papercrafts was put into administration due to having no buyer, and the resultant, now void 'shell' of Ideal Shopping Direct Limited was put into administration.

References

External links
 idealworld.tv
 Create and Craft with Ideal World

Shopping networks in the United Kingdom
Television channels and stations established in 2000
Companies based in Peterborough